The Comptroller of the Navy originally called the Clerk Comptroller of the Navy was originally a principal member of the English Navy Royal, and later the British Royal Navy, Navy Board. From 1512 until 1832, the Comptroller was mainly responsible for all British naval spending and directing the business of the Navy Board from 1660 as its chairman. The position was abolished in 1832 when the Navy Board was merged into the Board of Admiralty. The comptroller was based at the Navy Office.

History
The post was originally created in 1512 during the reign of Henry VIII of England when the post holder was styled as the Clerk Comptroller until 1545 in 1561 the name was changed to Comptroller of the Navy. He presided over the Board from 1660, and generally superintended the business of the Navy Office, and was responsible for the offices dealing with bills, accounts and wages during the sixteenth and seventeenth centuries. By the eighteenth century the principal officer responsible for estimating annual stores requirements, inspecting ships' stores and maintaining the Fleet's store-books and repair-bills was the Surveyor of the Navy; however, his duties passed increasingly to the Comptroller of the Navy during the latter half this period. The office of Surveyor did not altogether disappear. In 1832 the Comptroller's department was abolished following a merger of the Navy Board with the Board of Admiralty and the Surveyor was made the officer responsible under the First Naval Lord for the material departments, and became an adviser to the Board of Admiralty. In 1860 the name of the office was changed to Controller of the Navy and in 1869 his office merged with the office of the Third Naval Lord and then became known as Third Naval Lord and Controller of the Navy, he became independent of the First Naval Lord and himself a member of the Board of Admiralty.

Office holders
Included:

Clerk Comptrollers of the Navy
John Hopton, 1512-1524 
Vice-Admiral, Sir Thomas Spert, 1524-1540 
John Osborne, 1540-1545 
William Broke, 1545-1561

Comptrollers of the Navy
Vice-Admiral William Holstocke, 1561–1580 
William Borough, 1580–1598 
Sir Henry Palmer 1598– 20 November 1611 
Sir Guylford Slingsby, 1611–1618
Post in commission 1618–1628
Sir Guylford Slingsby 1628–1631
Sir Henry Palmer, 1632–1641
Vice-Admiral Sir George Carteret, 1641–1642
Sir Robert Slingsby, 31 August 1660 - 26 October 1661 
Vice-Admiral Sir John Mennes, 28 November 1661 – 18 February 1671 
 Admiral Sir Thomas Allin, 15 April 1671 – 28 January 1680 
 Thomas Hayter, 28 January 1680 - 2 February 1682 
Vice-Admiral Sir Richard Haddock, 2 February 1682 – 17 April 1686 
Post vacant 1686-1688
Admiral Sir Richard Haddock, 12 October 1688 – 26 January 1715 
Rear-Admiral Sir Charles Wager, 16 March 1715 – 23 April 1718 
Thomas Swanton, 23 April 1718 - 9 February 1723 
Vice Admiral James Mighells, 9 February 1723 – 21 March 1734  
Captain Richard Haddock, 27 April 1734 – 27 March 1749 
Captain Savage Mostyn, 27 March 1749 – 28 February 1755 
Commodore Edward Falkingham, 28 February 1755 - 25 November 1755 
Captain Charles Saunders, 25 November 1755 – 24 June 1756 
Captain Digby Dent, 24 June 1756 - 29 December 1756 
Captain George Cockburne, 29 December 1756 – 20 July 1770 
Captain Sir Hugh Palliser, 6 August 1770 – 12 April 1775 
Captain Maurice Suckling, 12 April 1775 – 14 July 1778 
Admiral Charles Middleton, 7 August 1778 – 29 March 1790 
Captain Sir Henry Martin, 29 March 1790 – 1 August 1794 
Captain Sir Andrew Hamond, 25 September 1794 – 3 March 1806 
Captain Henry Nicholls, 3 March 1806 – 20 June 1806
Vice-Admiral Sir Thomas Thompson, 20 June 1806 – 24 February 1816 
Admiral Sir Thomas Byam Martin, 24 February 1806 – 2 November 1831 
Rear-Admiral Hon. George Dundas, 2 November 1831 - June 1832 

In 1832 the post of Comptroller of the Navy was abolished and duties passed to the Surveyor of the Navy.

See also
 Admiralty in the 16th century
 History of the Royal Navy

References

Sources
 Childs. David (2009). Tudor Sea Power: The Foundation of Greatness. Seaforth Publishing. .
 Collinge, J.M. (1978). Navy Board officials, 1660-1832 Volume 7 of Office-holders in modern Britain. London: University of London, Institute of Historical Research.

External links
 Office-Holders in Modern Britain: Volume 7, Navy Board Officials 1660–1832, ed. J M Collinge (London, 1978), British History Online http://www.british-history.ac.uk/office-holders/vol7 [accessed 25 March 2017].

C
N
1561 establishments in England
1832 disestablishments in the United Kingdom